The Pathological Society is a professional organisation of Great Britain and Ireland whose mission is stated as 'understanding disease'.

Membership and profile 

The membership of the society is mainly drawn from the UK and includes an international membership. Members are clinical and experimental pathologists. There is a strong representation of academic pathologists within the membership. A flourishing Trainees Group operates within the membership and represents those who are in the process of training in the discipline of pathology. More recently, in parallel with the Royal College of Pathologists, the society introduced an undergraduate membership scheme as part of an initiative to increase undergraduate engagement in pathology and research.

The society is run by a committee elected from its membership. A group of Officers of the Society manage executive functions. These include a President (Ian Ellis), a General Secretary (Richard Byers), a Treasurer (Nicholas Rooney) and a Meetings Secretary (Adrienne Flanagan).

Several subcommittees advise the main committee, especially in developing research, education & training.

The society is registered as a charity in the UK.

Activities 

The society promotes its mission through a range of activities and initiatives.
 Meetings: typically two each year at which lectures, original research and workshops are used to share  information.
 Lectures: the society supports several named lectures each year.
 Doniach Lecture
 Goudie Lecture and medal
 Oakley Lecture
 Grants: The society funds a range of studentships and related activities aligned to its mission.
 Journal: The Journal of Pathology is sponsored by the society and published by Wiley. It is the highest ranked pathology journal as measured by its impact factor.

History 
The Pathological Society of Great Britain and Ireland was established in 1906. Its original membership reflected a wide set of disciplines within pathology. Society membership is generally aligned to practitioners of cellular pathology. In 2006 the society celebrated its centenary.

A monograph outlining the full history of the society was published as a limited edition in 2006 to mark the Centenary.  It was edited by Peter Hall (then the Secretary of the Society and now the editor of the Journal of Pathology) and Nicholas Wright (the then President of the Society).  All the chapters of the monograph are freely available as PDFs from the society  website which also has a brief summary of the society's history.

References

External links
 The Pathological Society of Great Britain and Ireland
  Journal of Pathology

Medical associations based in the United Kingdom
Organisations based in the City of London
Pathology organizations
1906 establishments in the United Kingdom
Scientific organizations established in 1906